There have been three baronetcies, all in the Baronetage of England, created for members of the family of Mansel, which played a major role in the early re-settlement of the Gower Peninsula, in Glamorgan, Wales. Only one creation is extant as of 2008.

The Mansel Baronetcy of Margam, in the County of Glamorgan, was created in the Baronetage of England on 22 May 1611. For more information on this creation, see the Baron Mansel.

The Mansel Baronetcy of Muddlescombe, in the County of Carmarthen, was created in the Baronetage of England on 14 January 1622 for Francis Mansel. He was the younger brother of the first Baronet of the 1611 creation. The ninth Baronet sat as Member of Parliament for Carmarthenshire. There was great confusion over the succession after the death of the eleventh Baronet in 1883. The rightful heir was believed to be Edward Berkeley Philipps (later Mansel), son of Courtenay Philipps, son of Richard Mansel, younger brother of the tenth Baronet. However, it was widely believed that Courtenay Philipps's first marriage was invalid. The title was therefore assumed by Edward Berkeley Philipps's brother Richard Philipps (later Mansel) as the twelfth Baronet. On his death in 1892 the title was assumed by his son Courtenay Cecil Mansel, the thirteenth Baronet. However, in 1903 the latter discovered evidence that his grandfather's first marriage was indeed valid and relinquished the use of the title in favour of his uncle Edward Berkeley Philipps (later Mansel), who became the twelfth Baronet. When he died childless in 1908 the title was resumed by his nephew Courtenay Cecil Mansel, the thirteenth Baronet. Sir Courtenay Cecil Mansel later represented Penryn and Falmouth in the House of Commons.

The Mansel Baronetcy of Trimsaran, in the County of Carmarthen, was created in the Baronetage of England on 22 February 1697 for Edward Mansel. The title became extinct on the death of the fourth Baronet in 1798.

Mansel baronets, of Margam (1611)
see the Baron Mansel

Mansel baronets, of Muddlescombe (1622)
Sir Francis Mansel, 1st Baronet (died )
Sir Walter Mansel, 2nd Baronet (c. 1588–1640)
Sir Francis Mansel, 3rd Baronet (died c. 1650)
Sir Edward Mansel, 4th Baronet (died c. 1680)
Sir Richard Mansel, 5th Baronet (1641–1691)
Sir Richard Mansel, 6th Baronet (died c. 1700)
Sir William Mansel, 7th Baronet (1670-c. 1732)
Sir Richard Mansel, 8th Baronet (died 1749)
Sir William Mansel, 9th Baronet (1739–1804)
Sir William Mansel, 10th Baronet (1766–1829)
Sir John Bell William Mansel, 11th Baronet (1806–1883)
Sir Richard Mansel, 12th Baronet (1850–1892) (wrongfully assumed title in 1883)
Sir Courtenay Cecil Mansel, 13th Baronet (1880–1933) (wrongfully assumed title in 1892; relinquished title in 1903)
Sir Edward Berkeley Mansel, 12th Baronet (1839–1908) (assumed title in 1903)
Sir Courtenay Cecil Mansel, 13th Baronet (1880–1933) (resumed title in 1908)
Sir John Philip Ferdinand Mansel, 14th Baronet (1910–1947)
Sir Philip Mansel, 15th Baronet (born 1943)

The heir apparent is the eldest son of the 15th baronet, John Philip Mansel (born 1982).

Mansel baronets, of Trimsaran (1697)
Sir Edward Mansel, 1st Baronet (died 1720)
Sir Edward Mansel, 2nd Baronet (died 1754)
Sir Edward Vaughan Mansel, 3rd Baronet (died 1788)
Sir Edward Joseph Shewen Mansel, 4th Baronet (died 1798)

Notes

References 
Kidd, Charles, Williamson, David (editors). Debrett's Peerage and Baronetage (1990 edition). New York: St Martin's Press, 1990, 

 

Mansel
Extinct baronetcies in the Baronetage of England
1622 establishments in England